The Marma, also known as Moghs, Mogs or Maghs, are the second-largest ethnic community in Bangladesh's Chittagong Hill Tracts, primarily residing in the Bandarban, Khagrachari and Rangamati Hill Districts. Some Marmas live in Bangladesh's coastal districts of Cox's Bazar and Patuakhali, while others live in Tripura, India and Myanmar. There are about 224,261 Marmas living in Bangladesh and 35,722 of them living in India. Since the 16th century, the Marma have considered the Bengal's Chittagong Hill Tracts their home, where they have established the Bohmong and Mong Circles (chiefdoms).

Ethnonyms 

Between the 17th and 18th centuries, the Rakhine began calling themselves Mranma (မြန်မာ) and its derivatives like Marama (မရမာ), as attested by texts like the Rakhine Minrazagri Ayedaw Sadan and the Dhanyawaddy Ayedawbon. This endonym continues to be used by the Marma. The term "Marma" is derived from "Myanmar," which was first used in the early 1100s. In the Marma and Arakanese, Myanmar is pronounced Mranma, not Myanma.

By 1585, European, Persian, and Bengali accounts began describing the Marma and Buddhist groups in the region as the Mugh or Magh, which were not used by the Marmas themselves. The word's etymology is likely to derive from Magadha, the name of an ancient Buddhist kingdom. The Marmas considered these names to be perjorative because of the word's association with piracy, and thus assumed the name Marma in the 1940s. Some Marmas in the Indian state of Tripura continue to self-identify as Marima, or as Moghs or Maghs.

History

The ancestors of the Marma, the Rakhine, live in a coastal region between Chittagong and the Arakan Mountains, in what is now Rakhine State of Myanmar. Between the 15th and 16th centuries, the Rakhine received a reputation for piracy in association with the Portuguese, due to endemic piracy in the Bay of Bengal. Between the 16th and 18th centuries, the Marmas migrated from their homeland to the Chittagong Hill Tracts, coinciding with the Kingdom of Mrauk U's conquest of Chittagong. 

Records of the East India Company and others indicate that the Marmas migrated from the Kingdom of Mrauk U to Chittagong of Bangladesh in two phases of migrations during 14th to 17th centuries in the golden period of Mrauk U. In the first phase, during the Mrauk U Kingdom expanded to some parts of Chittagong Division. Secondly, Marma ancestors fled to Chittagong and settled down as the Arakanese kingdom was conquered and annexed by Burmese king Bodawpaya in 1785.

In 1971, following the Bangladesh Liberation War in which Bangladesh achieved independence, the country's majority Bengali Muslims began settling in the Chittagong Hill Tracts, which has displaced native inhabitants.

Genetic studies
Genetic studies have indicated that the Marma populations share a high frequency of Indian and low frequency of East Asian specific maternal haplogroups, and have the highest haplotype diversity when compared with Tripura and Chakma populations, suggesting deep colonization of the region by Marmas.

Culture

The Marmas are subdivided into 12 clans, named after the place from where they migrated. These clans include the Ragraisa, consisting of Marmas living south of the Karnaphuli river, the Palaingsa from Ramgarh Upazila, the Khyongsa (ချောင်းသား) from riverside communities, the Toungsa (တောင်သား) from the hill ridges, and smaller clans including the Longdusa, the Frangsa, the Kyokara-sa, and the Talongsa (တလိုင်းသား).

The culture of the Marmas is similar to that of the Rakhine people, including their language, food, clothes, religion, dance, and funeral rites. Marma men wear a sarong called lungyi, while Marma women wear a sarong called thabein.

Marmas mostly depend on agriculture, traditionally practicing slash-and-burn cultivation on the hills. Their belief in Theravada Buddhism is as deep as the Rakhine society's, with an emphasis on ritual practices in deities. Some Marmas also practice Animism, Christianity and Islam.

Marmas follow the Burmese calendar. They celebrate the New Year, called Sangrai, which begins on the first day of Bohag. They make sangraimu, which is a form of traditional cakes. They take part in Sangrain Relong Pwe (water pouring), where young Marma men and women spray each other with water. Sangrai is celebrated in three days, On the 1st day, called Painchwai or Akro, homes are decorated with flowers. On the 2nd day, Sangrai Akya, Marmas participate in traditional sports, dances, cultural activities and hold meetings regarding community issues. They also go to monasteries to participate in the Buddha statue's bathing (cleansing) ritual on this day. On the 3rd day, called Sangrai Atada, they cook a vegetable dish made out of more than 100 ingredients, called hangbong (pachan in Bangla).

After death, Marma elderlies are cremated, while younger deceased Marmas are buried.

Festival 
Like other ethnic peoples, the Marma's celebrate a variety of traditional festivals such as birth, death, marriage and New Year. The main festivals of Marma's are: - Buddha Purnima , Kathina , Oyahgyai or Prabarana Purnima , Sangrai etc. The Marma New Year festival is called Sangrai . In addition to these festivals, other natural festivals are also celebrated, which are often similar to other indigenous ethnic groups in Bangladesh.

Buddha Punirma 

On this full moon day, Mahamati Gautam Buddha was born, attained enlightenment and attained Mahaparinirvana . It is a religious festival. Every year the festival is celebrated with great enthusiasm and fervor.

Kathina 

One night it's the color of cotton yarn from the Buddhist beggars wear cibara are made each solid cibara say.

Wagyai or Pravarana 

Wagyai or Pravarana Purnima is a major religious festival of the Marmas. On this day this festival is celebrated with great joy and happiness in every society of Marmas and Bihar. These days delicious cakes are made at home. On this day at night, lanterns are blown to worship and dedicate the great hair of Gautam Buddha .

Sangrai 
 
The name of the Marma New Year festival is ' Sangrai '. This is one of their main traditional ceremonies. They organize this festival on the Bengali new year occasion of month Boishakh. On the occasion of the New Year, they organize various interesting events in Sangrai. Water festival is one of these events. On that day, the Marma youths rejoiced by sprinkling water on each other. By sprinkling water, they wash away the dirt and ink of the past year. Apart from that, they also find the person of their choice through water sports. In addition to water sports, they celebrate the Sangrai festival by performing other rituals such as pangchowai (flower sangrai), sangrai ji, candle lighting and buddhasnan. They enjoy their festivals by speaking on their mother tongue.

Notable People
 Aungmraching Marma, Bangladeshi national team footballer and former captain
 Suinu Pru Marma, Bangladeshi former national team footballer and captain, currently a coach
 Uk Ching Marma, Bangladeshi freedom fighter
 Ushwe Sing, Bangladeshi politician
 Saching Prue Jerry, Bangladeshi politician
 Aung Shwe Prue Chowdhury, Bangladeshi politician
 Ma Mya Ching, Bangladeshi politician
 Anai Mogini, Bangladeshi Footballer

See also

 Bamar people
 Barua (Bangladesh)
 Bengali Buddhists
 Bohmong Circle
 Buddhism in Bangladesh
 Mong Circle
 Persecution of Buddhists in Bangladesh
 Rakhine people
 Sangrai festival in Bangladesh
 U Pannya Jota Mahathera

References

External links 
 Ethnologue profile
 Photographs of the Marma people
 

 
 
Ethnic groups in Bangladesh
Chittagong Division
Sino-Tibetan-speaking people